The 1903 Central Michigan Normalites football team represented Central Michigan Normal School, later renamed Central Michigan University, as an independent during the 1903 college football season. Their head coach was Charles Tambling. This was part of a ten–game win streak that started in 1902 and ended in 1905.

Schedule

References

Central Michigan
Central Michigan Chippewas football seasons
Central Michigan Normalites football
College football undefeated seasons